"Practice What You Preach" is the title of a number-one R&B single by singer Barry White, written by White, Gerald Levert, Edwin Nicholas, from White's 1994 album The Icon Is Love. The hit song spent three weeks at number-one on the US R&B chart and reached 18 on the pop chart. It became a gold record. The 1994 single also won a Soul Train Music Award for Best R&B/Soul Song of the Year.

Charts

Weekly charts

Year-end charts

See also
R&B number-one hits of 1994 (USA)

References

Barry White songs
1994 songs
1994 singles
Songs written by Barry White
Songs written by Gerald Levert